Chalonnes-sur-Loire is a commune in the Maine-et-Loire department in western France. It is located on the left bank of the river Loire in the Loire Valley UNESCO World Heritage Site area.

Geography
The town is in the heart of the Anjou, a historical agricultural region southwest of Angers renowned for Loire Valley wines. The Layon flows into the Loire at the commune.

The airport nearest to Chalonnes-sur-Loire for regional flights is Angers – Loire Airport (41 km), and for international flights is Nantes Atlantique Airport (67 km).

Population

Twin towns
Chalonnes-sur-Loire is twinned with:
 Tecklenburg, North Rhine-Westphalia, Germany (since 1982)
 Sanniki, Masovian Voivodeship, Poland
 Ballinasloe, County Galway, Ireland

See also
Communes of the Maine-et-Loire department
Passage SAS

References

Chalonnessurloire